The 1940–41 AHL season was the fifth season of the American Hockey League, which had operated the previous four seasons as the "International-American Hockey League." Nine teams played 56 games each in the schedule.

The Cleveland Barons won their second F. G. "Teddy" Oke Trophy as the Western Division champions, and their second Calder Cup as league champions.

Team changes
The Syracuse Stars moved to Buffalo, New York, becoming the second incarnation of the Buffalo Bisons.

Final standings
Note: GP = Games played; W = Wins; L = Losses; T = Ties; GF = Goals for; GA = Goals against; Pts = Points;

Scoring leaders

Note: GP = Games played; G = Goals; A = Assists; Pts = Points; PIM = Penalty minutes

 complete list

Calder Cup playoffs

See also
List of AHL seasons

References
AHL official site
AHL Hall of Fame
HockeyDB

American Hockey League seasons
2